Trichlorofluorosilane (Silicon trichloride fluoride) is an inorganic compound. It is used to produce silicon for use in the manufacturing of semiconductor and fiber optic materials.

References

Inorganic silicon compounds
Fluorides
Nonmetal halides
Chlorosilanes